Dennis Anthony John Sharp (16 June 1915 – 23 July 1984) was an English actor, writer and director.

Stage career 
Anthony Sharp was a graduate of the London Academy of Music and Dramatic Art (LAMDA) and made his stage debut in February 1938 with HV Neilson's Shakespearean touring company, playing the Sergeant in Macbeth at the De La Warr Pavilion, Bexhill-on-Sea. Repertory engagements in Wigan, Hastings, Peterborough and Liverpool were followed by war service, after which he resumed his stage career at the Mercury Theatre, Notting Hill Gate in September 1946, playing Hansell in Tangent.

He first appeared in the West End in Family Portrait at the Strand Theatre in February 1948. Among his many subsequent appearances were Cry Liberty (Vaudeville Theatre 1950), Who Goes There! (Vaudeville Theatre 1951), For Better, For Worse (Comedy Theatre 1952), Small Hotel (St Martin's Theatre 1955), No Time for Sergeants (Her Majesty's Theatre 1956), The Edwardians (Saville Theatre 1959), She's Done It Again (Garrick Theatre 1969), The Avengers (Prince of Wales Theatre 1971) and Number One (Queen's Theatre 1984).

Other London credits included The Rivals (Sadler's Wells 1972), She Stoops to Conquer (Lyric Hammersmith 1982) and several appearances at the Open Air Theatre Regent's Park. There he played Benedick in Much Ado About Nothing in 1958 and Malvolio in Twelfth Night the following year, rejoining the company in 1978 for such plays as The Man of Destiny.

Writer and director
Sharp was also a playwright. His stage version of the Thomas Love Peacock novel Nightmare Abbey was a big hit at the Westminster Theatre in 1952, opening there on 27 February. "Anthony Sharp's altogether delightful adaptation provided one of the most unusual as well as most amusing offerings of the season," commented Theatre World editor Frances Stephens. After a try-out in Sheffield, the historical drama The Conscience of the King was remounted at the Theatre Royal Windsor, starting on 14 March 1955; Sharp himself played 17th century parliamentarian John Hampden. A third play, Tale of a Summer's Day, was written in 1959.

In addition Sharp was a prolific director, particularly of comedy-thrillers and 'boardroom' dramas. His credits included Any Other Business (Westminster Theatre 1958), Caught Napping (Piccadilly Theatre 1959), Wolf's Clothing (Strand Theatre 1959), Billy Bunter Flies East (Victoria Palace 1959), The Gazebo (Savoy Theatre 1960), Guilty Party (St Martin's Theatre 1961), Critic's Choice (Vaudeville Theatre 1961), Act of Violence (1962 UK tour), Devil May Care (Strand Theatre 1963), Difference of Opinion (Garrick Theatre 1963), Hostile Witness (Haymarket Theatre 1964), Wait Until Dark (Strand Theatre 1966), Justice is a Woman (Vaudeville Theatre 1966) and Harvey (1970 UK tour). He also directed several productions in Hong Kong and Australia.

Cinema, television and radio

Cinema
Sharp was frequently cast as supercilious professional or aristocratic types, notably in the Stanley Kubrick films A Clockwork Orange (as Minister of the Interior) and Barry Lyndon (as Lord Hallam). Other film credits include Cornel Wilde's No Blade of Grass, two for Michael Winner (The Jokers and I'll Never Forget What's'isname), Russ Meyer's Black Snake and the Disney film One of Our Dinosaurs is Missing. His only starring role in a feature film was the homicidal priest Father Xavier Meldrum in Pete Walker's 1975 horror picture House of Mortal Sin.

His final feature film, in which he played foreign secretary Lord Ambrose, was the James Bond picture Never Say Never Again, released in 1983.

Television
In 1977 he had a leading role in the children's television series The Flockton Flyer. Other TV dramas in which he appeared included Angel Pavement, The Plane Makers, Doomwatch, The Rivals of Sherlock Holmes, Crown Court, Upstairs, Downstairs, Schalcken the Painter and The Life and Times of David Lloyd George. He also played numerous cameo parts in sitcoms, notably Dad's Army (1969, 1977), Steptoe and Son (three episodes, 1970–74), Nearest and Dearest (1973), Man About the House (1975), Rising Damp (1975), George & Mildred (1976, 1978), Wodehouse Playhouse, (1978), and To the Manor Born (eight episodes, 1979–81). He worked frequently with such TV comedians as Benny Hill, Morecambe and Wise, Frankie Howerd and Bernie Winters, and towards the end of his life appeared in the early-1980s alternative comedy programmes The Young Ones and The Comic Strip.

Radio
In 1974, he appeared as the vicar in the radio version of Steptoe and son.  In 1978, he appeared as both Garkbit, the waiter at the Restaurant at the End of the Universe , and The Great Prophet Zarquon, in Fit the Fifth of the original radio series of The Hitchhiker's Guide to the Galaxy. In 1981, he appeared as the town clerk of the fictional Frambourne Town Council in the pilot episode of It Sticks Out Half a Mile, the radio sequel to Dad's Army; it was in that episode that Arthur Lowe reprised his role of Captain Mainwaring for the very last time several months before his death. In 1982–84 Sharp was a regular as Major Dyrenforth on the Radio 2 series The Random Jottings of Hinge and Bracket, his last few episodes being broadcast posthumously.

Personal life
He was born Dennis Anthony John Sharp in Highgate in 1915 and was an insurance policy draughtsman before training as an actor. From 1940 to 1946 he served with the Royal Corps of Signals and the Royal Artillery in North Africa, Italy and Austria. "Once the war was over," he recalled, "I wangled a transfer to the Army Broadcasting Service and helped run radio stations at Naples and Rome. These were very full and very pleasant days—announcing, script-writing, disc-jockeying, organising programmes, producing, acting."<ref>Anthony Sharp, 'About the Author', Curtain Up: The Only Repertory Theatre Magazine vol 12 no 8, 28 February 1955</ref> He married the actress Margaret Wedlake in July 1953 and had a son, Jonathan, was born in 1954. In Who's Who in the Theatre he listed his favourite part as Malvolio and his recreations as church architecture and watching cricket. He died of natural causes aged 69 in his native London; at the time of his death he was playing the Doctor in the West End production of Jean Anouilh's Number One at the Queen's Theatre.

Selected filmography

 Conspiracy in Tehran (1946)
 The Sword and the Rose (1953) – French Diplomat
 You Know What Sailors Are (1954) – Humphrey – Naval Attache (uncredited)
 Wicked as They Come (1956)
 The Man Who Wouldn't Talk (1958) – Baker
 Left Right and Centre (1959) – Peteron
 Clue of the Silver Key (1961) – Mike Hennessey
 Invasion (1965) – Lawrence Blackburn
 Doctor in Clover (1966) – Dr. Dean Loftus
 Martin Soldat (1966) – Le major
 The Jokers (1967) – Prosecuting Lawyer (uncredited)
 I'll Never Forget What's'isname (1967) – Mr. Hamper Down (uncredited)
 Hot Millions (1968) – Hollis (uncredited)
 Crossplot (1969) – Vicar
 Doctor in Trouble (1970) – Chief Surgeon
 No Blade of Grass (1970) – Sir Charles Brenner
 Die Screaming, Marianne (1971) – Registrar
 A Clockwork Orange (1971) – Minister Frederick
 I Want What I Want (1972) – Mr. Parkhurst
 Some Kind of Hero (1972) – Barrister
 Black Snake (1973) – Lord Clive
 Gawain and the Green Knight (1973) – King
 Mistress Pamela (1974) – Longman
 Percy's Progress (1974) – Judge
 The Amorous Milkman (1975) – Counsel
 One of Our Dinosaurs Is Missing (1975) – Home Secretary
 Barry Lyndon (1975) – Lord Hallam
 House of Mortal Sin (1976) – Father Xavier Meldrum
 Crossed Swords (1977) – Dr. Buttes
 Abortar en Londres (1977) – Dr. Brown
 Schalcken the Painter (1979, TV Movie) – Gentleman
 Never Say Never Again'' (1983) – Lord Ambrose

References

External links
 

1915 births
1984 deaths
English male film actors
English male television actors
People from Highgate
20th-century English male actors
British Army personnel of World War II
Royal Corps of Signals soldiers
Royal Artillery personnel
Military personnel from London